Björn Tom Fredrik Nordström (born 5 January 1967) is a Swedish musician and record producer, best known as the guitarist of heavy metal band Dream Evil. Nordström is one of the leading melodic death metal and power metal producers in Sweden and has worked with some of said genres' top acts, including At the Gates, Arch Enemy, Nightrage, Dark Tranquillity, In Flames, Soilwork, Opeth, and Powerwolf.

Fascinated by technology from a young age, Nordström opened a small recording studio in Gothenburg, mainly to record his own music. The studio evolved into Studio Fredman, one of the leading Swedish recording studios where he works with his employee Henrik Udd.

In 1999, Nordström formed the heavy metal band Dream Evil to perform his own music, and as of 2010, Dream Evil has released five albums, one live DVD/CD set, and two EPs. Today, Nordström is considered one of the top metal producers in Europe, and one of the central figures of the Gothenburg style.

Discography with Dream Evil
Dragonslayer (2002)
Evilized (2003)
Children of the Night (EP, 2003)
The First Chapter (EP, 2004)
The Book of Heavy Metal (2004)
United (2006)
Gold Medal in Metal (Alive & Archive) (2008)
In the Night (2010)
Six (2017)

Production credits


1990
Calcutta Cornflakes (demo)

1993
Ceremonial Oath – The Book of Truth

1994
At the Gates – Terminal Spirit Disease
In Flames – Lunar Strain (mixing, engineering)
In Flames – Subterranean (EP) (engineering)

1995
At the Gates – Slaughter of the Soul
Dark Tranquillity – Of Chaos and Eternal Night (EP)
Dark Tranquillity – The Gallery
Memory Garden – Forever (EP)

1996
Arch Enemy – Black Earth
Dark Tranquillity – Enter Suicidal Angels (EP)
In Flames – The Jester Race
LOK – Ord och inga visor
Memory Garden – Tides
Sacrilege – Lost in the Beauty You Slay
Sludge Nation – Wisehead
Sludge Nation – Blow Your Speakers with Sludge Nation

1997
Armageddon – Crossing the Rubicon
Dark Tranquillity – The Mind's I
Dimension Zero – Penetrations from the Lost World
HammerFall – Glory to the Brave
In Flames – Black-Ash Inheritance (EP)
In Flames – Whoracle
Lord Belial – Enter the Moonlight Gate
Misanthrope – Visionnaire
Sacrilege – The Fifth Season
Skitsystem – Levande Lik

1998
Arch Enemy – Stigmata
Exhumation – Dance Across the Past
HammerFall – Legacy of Kings
The Haunted – The Haunted
Misanthrope – Libertine Humiliations
Opeth – My Arms, Your Hearse
Embraced – Amorous Anathema
Runemagick – The Supreme Force of Eternity
Soilwork – Steelbath Suicide
Spiritual Beggars – Mantra III

1999
Arch Enemy – Burning Bridges
Dark Tranquillity – Projector
Exhumation – Traumaticon
In Flames – Colony
Malevolence – Martyrialized
Opeth – Still Life
Septicflesh – Revolution DNA
Sinergy – Beware the Heavens

2000
Arch Enemy – Burning Japan Live 1999
Buried Dreams – Perceptions
The Crown – Deathrace King
Dark Tranquillity – Haven
In Flames – Clayman
Sludge – Scarecrow Messiah
Soilwork – The Chainheart Machine
Spiritual Beggars – Ad Astra

2001
Arch Enemy – Wages of Sin
Dimmu Borgir – Puritanical Euphoric Misanthropia
Godgory – Way Beyond
Opeth – Blackwater Park (mixing)
Soilwork – A Predator's Portrait

2002
Arch Enemy – Burning Angel (EP)
Dark Tranquillity – Damage Done
Dragonland – Holy War
Dream Evil – Dragonslayer
Eternal Oath – Righteous
Firewind – Between Heaven and Hell
The Fifth Sun – The Moment of Truth
Opeth – Deliverance (engineering)
Sinergy – Suicide by My Side
Soilwork – Natural Born Chaos

2003
On Thorns I Lay – Egocentric
Evergrey – Recreation Day
Soilwork – Figure Number Five
Darkest Hour – Hidden Hands of a Sadist Nation
Dimmu Borgir – Death Cult Armageddon
Dream Evil – Evilized
Firewind – Burning Earth
The Haunted – One Kill Wonder
Nightrage – Sweet Vengeance
Old Man's Child – In Defiance of Existence
Pagan's Mind – Celestial Entrance
Passenger – Passenger
Septicflesh – Sumerian Daemons
Zyklon – Aeon

2004
Ancient – Night Visit (mixing)
Dark Tranquillity – Exposures – In Retrospect and Denial
Dream Evil – The Book of Heavy Metal
The Fifth Sun – The Hunger to Survive
The Haunted – Revolver
Rotting Christ – Sanctus Diavolos (mastering)
Sludge – Yellow Acid Rain

2005
Contrive – The Meaning Unseen
Dark Tranquillity – Character (mixing)
Dragonlord – Black Wings of Destiny
Eternal Oath – Wither
Firewind – Forged by Fire (mixing assistance)
Nightrage – Descent into Chaos
Old Man's Child – Vermin
Pagan's Mind – Enigmatic: Calling
Powerwolf – Return in Bloodred

2006
Bleed in Vain – Say Everything Will Be Fine (mixing)
Dream Evil – United
Ever Since – Between Heaven and Hell
Firewind – Allegiance (mixing)
Dragonland – Astronomy (mixing)
I Killed the Prom Queen – Music for the Recently Deceased
Lyzanxia – Unsu
Machinae Supremacy – Redeemer
Norther – Till Death Unites Us
Splitter – En Sorglig Historia
Wolf – The Black Flame

2007
All Ends – Wasting Life (EP)
All Ends – All Ends
Anthelion – Bloodshed Rebefallen
Arch Enemy – Rise of the Tyrant
Dimmu Borgir – In Sorte Diaboli
Iron Fire – Blade of Triumph
Powerwolf – Lupus Dei
Breed – Breed (mixing)

2008
Bring Me the Horizon – Suicide Season
Coming Fall – Kill the Lights
Eclipse Eternal – Ubermensch: Evolution Beyond the Species
Evergrey  – Torn
Firewind – The Premonition
The Hollow Earth Theory – Rise of Agartha
Norther – N
Septicflesh – Communion
Zonaria – The Cancer Empire
Cripple Bastards – Variante alla Morte
Arkan – Hilal

2009
Eyes of Noctum – Inceptum
Feed Her to the Sharks – The Beauty of Falling (mixing)
Job for a Cowboy – Ruination (mixing)
Narnia – Course of a Generation
Nightrage – Wearing a Martyr's Crown (production/mixing/keyboards)
Old Man's Child – Slaves of the World
Outrage – Outrage
Powerwolf – Bible of the Beast
Mean Streak – Metal Slave (mixing)
Wintergrave – Final Termination (EP)

2010
Bring Me the Horizon – There Is a Hell Believe Me I've Seen It. There Is a Heaven Let's Keep It a Secret.
Buried in Verona – Saturday Night Sever
Dream Evil – In the Night
Dreamshade – What Silence Hides
Demovore – Beneath Darkened Skies (mixing/mastering/re-amping, other work by Christopher Karlsrud)
Sabaton – Coat of Arms (mixing)
Arkan – Salam
Nightrage – Vengeance Descending (production/mixing/keyboards)

2011
Akrya – Akrya (mastering)
Nervosia – Apathy's Throne (EP) (mixing/mastering)
Hamlet – Amnesia (mixing/mastering)
Powerwolf – Blood of the Saints
Nightrage – Insidious (mixing/mastering)
Confession – The Long Way Home
Shadowside – Inner Monster Out
Myrath – Tales of the Sands (mixing)
Adept – Death Dealers

2012
A Breach of Silence – Dead or Alive
At the Skylines – The Secrets to Life (producer)
Deathronic – Duality Chaos (mixing/mastering)
Eths – III
Far West Battlefront – Chapters (mixing/mastering)
Feed Her to the Sharks – Savage Seas
Furnaze – None More Black
Midnight in Alaska – Boundless
Buried in Verona – Notorious
InnerSiege – Kingdom of Shadows (mixing/mastering)

2013
Delta – The End of Philosophy (mixing)
Artificial Heart – A Heart Once Lost (mixing/mastering)
Adept – Silence the World
Raven Lord – Descent to the Underworld (mixing)
Desolated – Disorder of Mind (mastering)
 Outrage – Outraged
 Powerwolf – Preachers of the Night
 Solium Fatalis – Solium Fatalis (mixing/mastering)
 Primitai – Rise Again (mixing/mastering)
 Excrecor – Hypnotic Affliction (mastering)

2014
 Tellus Terror  –  EZ Life DV8 (mixing and mastering)
 I Killed the Prom Queen – Beloved
 Architects – Lost Forever // Lost Together
 HammerFall – (r)Evolution
 A Breach of Silence – The Darkest Road (producer)
 At the Gates – At War with Reality
 Forget My Silence – Supersonic

2015
 Dawn Protection – Eternal (mixing and mastering)
 Powerwolf – Blessed & Possessed (producer)
 Buried in Verona – Vultures Above, Lions Below
 Chabtan – The Kiss of Coatlicue (mastering)

2016
 Follow My Lead – Spit, Kick, Revolt.
 Architects – All Our Gods Have Abandoned Us
 HammerFall – Built to Last

2018
 The Moor – Jupiter's Immigrants (mixing and mastering)

2019
 O.Y.D. – Indigo
 Voice of Ruin – Acheron
 The Offering – Home
 Lagerstein – 25/7

2020
 Aqvilea - Beyond the Elysian Fields

2021
 Iotunn – Access All Worlds (mixing and mastering)
 The Moor – Wrath of Vultures (mixing and mastering)
 The Moor – Emissaries (mixing and mastering)
 Act of Denial – Negative (mixing and mastering
 Obscura – A Valediction (mixing and mastering)

2022
 Nightrage – Abyss Rising

See also
Dream Evil
Studio Fredman

References

External links
Official website of Studio Fredman

Swedish record producers
Swedish heavy metal guitarists
Heavy metal producers
Living people
1967 births
Dream Evil members